Golden Boys is a Brazilian band formed in 1958, originally a doo-wop band, having influences also of rock and roll and Brazilian rock. They are composed of brothers Roberto, Ronaldo, and Renato Corrêa José Maria (members of Trio Esperança) and a cousin, Valdir Anunciação. Their first hit was "Meu Romance com Laura", followed in the next decades by "Michelle", "Se Eu Fosse Você", "Andança", "Mágoa", "Pensando Nela", and "O Cabeção". In 1971, Renato became a producer and left the group.

Discography

References

Doo-wop groups
Brazilian rock music groups
Jovem Guarda
Musical groups established in 1958
Polydor Records artists
1958 establishments in Brazil